Euphaedra piriformis, the per-banded Themis forester, is a butterfly in the family Nymphalidae. It is found in Cameroon, Gabon, the Republic of the Congo and the Democratic Republic of the Congo (Kinshasa). The habitat consists of wet forests.

References

Butterflies described in 1982
piriformis